Baryatinsky (masculine), Baryatinskaya (feminine), or Baryatinskoye (neuter) may refer to:
Baryatinsky District, a district of Kaluga Oblast, Russia
Baryatinsky (family), a princely family of Rurikid stock:
Yury Baryatinsky (died 1685), Russian knyaz, boyar, and voyevoda
Leonilla Bariatinskaya, Russian princess

Russian-language surnames